Jagdfliegerführer 5 (Jafü 5) was formed September 6, 1943 in Bernay from Jagdfliegerführer 3, subordinated to 5. Jagd-Division. The headquarters was located at Bernay (fr). The unit was disbanded on July 1, 1944.

Commanding officers

Fliegerführer
Oberst Gordon Gollob, September 1943 - May 1944
unknown

References
Notes

References
 Jagdfliegerführer 5 @ Lexikon der Wehrmacht
 Jagdfliegerführer 5 @ The Luftwaffe, 1933-45

Luftwaffe Fliegerführer
Military units and formations established in 1943
Military units and formations disestablished in 1944